Young Justice: Outsiders is the third season of the American animated superhero series Young Justice, developed by Brandon Vietti and Greg Weisman. The series follows the lives of teenage superheroes and sidekicks who are members of a covert operation group, referred to simply as "The Team", that acts as a young counterpart to the famous adult team, the Justice League. In the second season, Invasion, the Reach revealed the existence of the meta-gene. Following on from these events, the third season focuses on the Team battling metahuman trafficking as various nations and organizations have started participating in such activities. It also features the superhero team Outsiders.

Young Justice originally aired on Cartoon Network for two seasons from 2010 to 2013, before being cancelled due to low toy sales and Mattel pulling funding. Following a strong fan campaign and high viewership ratings on Netflix, the series was officially renewed for a third season by Warner Bros. in November 2016. Development on Outsiders began the next month. By July 2017, it was split into two separate sections/arcs, each consisting of 13 episodes, making a total of 26 for the whole season.

The first half of the season was released between January 4 and 25, 2019, on DC's new digital platform, DC Universe, for a total of 13 episodes. The second half of the season, consisting of the remaining 13 episodes, premiered on July 2, 2019. During the Young Justice portion of the DC Universe panel at the 2019 San Diego Comic-Con, executive producers Greg Weisman and Brandon Vietti announced that production for the fourth season titled Phantoms is already underway to continue the story after Outsiders. The fourth season premiered on HBO Max on October 16, 2021.

Episodes

The first letter of each episode spells out a hidden phrase: "Prepare the Anti-Life Equation".

Cast and characters

The Team
 Stephanie Lemelin as Artemis Crock / Tigress
 Danica McKellar as M'gann M'orzz / Miss Martian
 Lauren Tom as Traci Thurston / Thirteen
 Zehra Fazal as Gabrielle "Violet Harper" Daou / Halo
 Alyson Stoner as Barbara Gordon / Oracle
 Jesse McCartney as Dick Grayson / Nightwing
 Cameron Bowen as Tim Drake / Robin
 Mae Whitman as Stephanie Brown / Spoiler
 Kelly Stables as Cissie King-Jones / Arrowette
 Cassandra Cain / Orphan

The Outsiders
 Greg Cipes as Garfield Logan / Beast Boy
 Mae Whitman as Cassie Sandsmark / Wonder Girl 
 Eric Lopez as Jaime Reyes / Blue Beetle 
 Jason Marsden as  Bart Allen / Kid Flash II
 Bryton James as Virgil Hawkins / Static 
 Troy Baker as Prince Brion Markov / Geo-Force
 Freddy Rodriguez as Eduardo "Ed" Dorado, Jr. / El Dorado
 Zeno Robinson as Victor Stone / Cyborg
 Jason Spisak as Fred Bugg / Forager
 Tara Strong as Princess Tara Markov / Terra
 Nolan North as Kon-El / Conner Kent / Superboy

Justice League
 Khary Payton as Kaldur'ahm / Aquaman II and Jefferson Pierce / Black Lightning 
 Jason Marsden as Dr. Ray Palmer / Atom
 Bruce Greenwood as Bruce Wayne / Batman
 Vanessa Marshall as Dinah Laurel Lance / Black Canary
 Kevin Michael Richardson as Doctor Fate, John Stewart / Green Lantern and J'onn J'onzz / Martian Manhunter
 David Kaye as Ralph Dibny / Elongated Man
 James Arnold Taylor as Barry Allen / Flash and Katar Hol / Hawkman
 Alan Tudyk as Oliver Queen / Green Arrow
 Troy Baker as Guy Gardner / Green Lantern
 Zehra Fazal as Shayera Hol / Hawkwoman
 Fred Tatasciore as Rex Mason / Metamorpho
 Jeff Bennett as John Smith / Red Tornado
 Denise Boutte as Raquel Ervin / Rocket
 Chad Lowe as Billy Batson / Shazam
 Zeno Robinson as John Henry Irons / Steel
 Nolan North as Kal-El / Clark Kent / Superman
 Maggie Q as Princess Diana / Diana Prince / Wonder Woman
 Lacey Chabert as Zatanna Zatara
 Tatsu Yamashiro / Katana
 Kate Kane / Batwoman
 Patrick O'Brien / Plastic Man
 Curtis Metcalf / Hardware
 Tora Olafsdotter / Ice
 Beatriz da Costa / Fire
 Augustus Freeman / Icon
 Nathaniel Adam / Captain Atom
 Hal Jordan / Green Lantern
 Daniel Cassidy / Blue Devil
 David Reid / Magog

The Light
 David Kaye as Vandal Savage
 Jenifer Lewis as Olympia Savage
 Marina Sirtis as Queen Bee
 Mark Rolston as Lex Luthor
 Khary Payton as Daniel "Danny" Brickwell / Brick
 Thom Adcox as Klarion the Witch Boy
 Fred Tatasciore as Slade Wilson / Deathstroke
 Danny Trejo as Bane
 Zehra Fazal as Cassandra Savage
 Gwendoline Yeo as Sandra Wu-San / Lady Shiva 
 Greg Weisman as Ultra-Humanite
 Grey Griffin as Dr. Helga Jace and Whisper A'Daire
 Steve Blum as Count Vertigo
 Jeff Bennett as Abra Kadabra
 Troy Baker as Dr. Simon Ecks
 Josh Keaton as Eric Needham / Black Spider
 Roger Craig Smith as Orm / Ocean-Master
 Nick Chinlund as Lawrence "Crusher" Crock / Sportsmaster
 Dwight Schultz as Jervis Tetch / Mad Hatter
 Joel Swetow as Richard Swift / Shade
 Diane Delano as Devastation
 Yuri Lowenthal as Zviad Baazovi, Cameron Mahkent / Icicle Jr., Otto Von Furth / Plasmus and Tommy Terror
 Zeno Robinson as Leonard Smalls / Holocaust
 Alan Tudyk as Psimon
 Nolan North as Baron Frederick DeLamb / Baron Bedlam
 Cairo De Frey/Scorpia A'Daire

New Gods of Apokolips
 Michael-Leon Wooley as Darkseid
 Dee Bradley Baker as Desaad and Kalibak
 Deborah Strang as Gretchen Goode, Granny Goodness
 Grey Griffin as Big Barda
 Gilotina
 Lashina 
 James Arnold Taylor as G. Gordon Godfrey
 Benjamin Diskin as M'Comm M'orzz / Ma'alefa'ak
 Andrew Kishino as Mantis

Doom Patrol
 Scott Menville as Dr. Niles Caulder / The Chief and Steve Dayton / Mento
 Hynden Walch as Rita Farr / Elasti-Woman
 Tara Strong as Valentina Vostok / Negative Woman
 Khary Payton as Clifford "Cliff" Steele / Robotman

Suicide Squad
 Sheryl Lee Ralph as Amanda Waller
 Crispin Freeman as George "Digger" Harkness / Captain Boomerang
 Khary Payton as David Hyde / Black Manta
 Monsieur Mallah
 Rick Flag

Meta-Human Youth Center
 Bruce Greenwood as Eduardo Dorado, Sr.
 Britt Baron as Leslie Willis / Livewire
 Daniela Bobadilla as Andie Murphy / Mist
 Zehra Fazal as Wendy Jones / Windfall
 Lauren Tom as Celia Windward
 Grey Griffin as Lia Briggs
 Nathaniel "Newt" Tryon / Neutron

The Forever People
 Bill Fagerbakke as Bear
 Grey Griffin as Dreamer

Infinity Inc.
 Zehra Fazal as Eliza Harmon / Trajectory
 Everyman
 Fury

Additional Characters
 Zehra Fazal as Lian Nguyen-Harper, Harper Row, Madia Daou 
 Crispin Freeman as Roy Harper / Arsenal, Will Harper / Red Arrow, Jim Harper / Guardian and King Gregor Markov
 Greg Weisman as Lucas "Snapper" Carr
 Grey Griffin as Lois Lane and Troia
 Kelly Hu as Jade Nguyen / Cheshire, Paula Nguyen-Crock
 Nolan North as Zatara
 Yuri Lowenthal as Garth / Tempest
 David Sobolov as Lobo
 Jacqueline Obradors as Alanna
 Masasa Moyo as Cat Grant, Anissa Pierce and Karen Beecher
 Whitney Moore as Courtney Whitmore
 Hynden Walch as Queen Perdita 
 Khary Payton as Dr. Silas Stone and Amistad Ervin
 Jacob Vargas as Cisco Ramon
 Denise Boutte as Lynn Stewart-Pierce
 Vic Chao as Doctor Moon
 Nicole Dubuc as Iris West-Allen
 Beth Payne as Doctor Sarah Charles
 Jeff Bennett as Casey Klebba
 Kath Soucie as Queen Mera of Atlantis
 Kevin Michael Richardson as Paul Sloane and Mal Duncan
 Oded Fehr as Ra's al Guhl
 Keone Young as Sensei
 Steven Blum as Dmitri Pushkin / Rocket Red
 Geoff Pierson as Jay Garrick
 Mae Whitman as Helena Sandsmark
 Phil LaMarr as Metron, King Orin of Atlantis, Dubbilex, Calvin Durham
 Sammy Sheik as Samad Daou 
 Tiya Sircar as Dolphin
 Tara Strong as Sha'lain'a
 Robbie Daymond as Wyynde
 Jason Spisak as Wally West / Kid Flash, Monkey
 Josh Keaton as Jason Todd / Red Hooded Ninja
 Troy Baker as Tod Donner
 Talia al Ghul
 Damian Wayne
 Don and Dawn Allen
 Jonathan Kent
 Joan Garrick

Production

Cancellation and revival
In January 2013, Cartoon Network had meetings with potential clients and promotional partners in which they announced their 2013–14 programming lineup with Young Justice being absent. A Warner Bros. Animation representative confirmed in an interview with Newsarama the cancellation of both Young Justice and Green Lantern: The Animated Series, with the DC Nation block replacing the series with Teen Titans Go! and Beware the Batman. While a fan-campaign was created in the hopes of financing continuations for both shows, Warner Bros. halted the campaign in May as they did not believe the goal could be reached.

In December 2013, Kevin Smith and Paul Dini claimed in an episode of Smith's podcast Fatman on Batman, that Young Justice was cancelled due to the program's high female viewership, as network executives did not believe girls would buy toys based on the show. Greg Weisman however denied this rumor and in a January 2016 episode of "The Hip-Hop Nerd" podcast, revealed the real reason why it was canceled. The show's funding was based on a toy deal with the toy company Mattel and due to low toy-sales, Mattel pulled the funding. With no other source of income to replace the money Mattel provided, the series was effectively canceled.

The possibility of Young Justice revival first occurred in early February 2016 when the series' second season was released on Netflix, with Weisman urging fans to watch all episodes "over and over" or buy the Blu-rays if they wished for a third season. Weisman later clarified that while neither Warner Bros. nor Netflix had expressed interest in picking up the show for a third season, high viewership on Netflix could motivate Warner Bros. into renewing the show. During June, Weisman revealed that the possibility of Young Justice being renewed was "very real" but noted that fans needed to keep the show trending in order to convince Warner and Netflix of its potential.

On November 7, 2016, it was officially confirmed by Sam Register, president of Warner Bros. Animation and Warner Digital Series, that Young Justice was renewed for a third season, stating that the dedicated fanbase and "[its] rallying cry for more episodes" resonated with them. It was also confirmed that Weisman and Brandon Vietti would be returning as showrunners.

Development and Writing
Weisman revealed in December 2016, that he and Vietti had already started working on the show's third season, and that the series would pick up story elements from the first two seasons, as well as the tie-in comic series. On February 27, 2017, Phil Bourassa—lead character designer of Young Justice—revealed that he had begun working on the third season. A week later, he revealed that some scripts had already been completed. On April 25, it was announced that the show's third season would be titled Young Justice: Outsiders and would debut on DC's new digital service. In late May, it was revealed that Chris Copeland joined the crew as a storyboard artist.

Outsiders had its own panel at San Diego Comic-Con International 2017 on July 21. During the panel, which was presented by Weisman, Vietti and Bourassa, they revealed that the first 12 scripts had already been finalized, ten were still being written and four more had not been started yet; this brought the total number of episodes for Outsiders to 26. The team's current roster was also revealed, consisting of: Static, Kid Flash, Robin, Wonder Girl, Spoiler, Blue Beetle, Beast Boy, and Arsenal as well as new characters Arrowette and Thirteen. It was also revealed that Dick Grayson / Nightwing, Artemis Crock, and Superboy would all be returning. Vandal Savage and the Light were confirmed to return. Regarding the all-black stealth suits worn by Nightwing, Artemis, Superboy, and Black Lightning, Bourassa stated that they are connected to Nightwing's story arc from the second season. The show jumps forward a few years.

Due to Young Justice: Outsiders airing on a streaming service rather than a television channel, it would "skew more adult to keep up with the characters as they age". When discussing the third season additions to "The Team" and its line-up, Weisman said that while the show would continue to focus on the characters introduced in the first season, they also wanted to introduce new characters as Young Justice is "a show about generations". According to Vietti, Outsiders would revisit ideas that he and Weisman had originally planned while making the first two seasons of the show.

Casting
The first voice actor confirmed to return was Khary Payton as Aqualad in February 2017. It was later revealed in April that voice work on Outsiders had started. In May, Alyson Stoner was later confirmed to return. In June, Nolan North revealed that he had recorded five episodes. In July, Marina Sirtis confirmed she would return to voice Queen Bee. Some actors did not reprise their roles. Miguel Ferrer who originally voiced Vandal Savage died in January 2017. He was succeeded in the role by David Kaye. Tim Curry who voiced G. Gordon Godfrey suffered a stroke in July 2012 that affected his voice. He was replaced by James Arnold Taylor. The show's voice work is recorded at Bang Zoom! Studios, succeeding at Studiopolis where the first two seasons were recorded at.

Animation
As with the previous seasons, Weisman confirmed that studios in South Korea are working on the animations. Digital eMation, another Korean studio which haven't worked on the series before, was also confirmed to be animating certain episodes. Post-release credits have shown that DR Movie and Digital eMation (credited as eMation) have worked on alternating episodes, and none of the studios from the first two seasons were involved in the production. The episodes "Nightmare Monkeys" and "Illusion of Control" were entirely animated by Studio Mir.

Release

Digital release
Young Justice: Outsiders premiered on January 4, 2019, on DC Universe, DC Comics' new digital media service. The first 13 episodes were released throughout January, with three episodes being released every Friday except January 25, where four episodes were released. The second half of 13 episodes premiered on July 2, 2019. In November 2017, it was announced that Outsiders would premiere "sometime after September", during the fourth quarter of 2018, but was pushed back to 2019 in June 2018.

On November 1, 2020, the series was made available on HBO Max.

Marketing
A panel to promote Outsiders was held at San Diego Comic-Con International (SDCC) on July 21, 2017, and was attended by Greg Weisman, Brandon Vietti and Phil Bourassa. At the panel, two pieces of artwork were released, showcasing the main members of the Team, which included three new characters. Additionally, new designs for Nightwing, Artemis, Superboy, and Black Lightning were also shown. Another panel was held at SDCC on July 20, 2018. The panel was once again attended by Weisman, Vietti, and Bourassa, alongside voice actors Troy Baker, and Stephanie Lemelin. During the panel, the first trailer was released, introducing numerous new characters.

On August 31, 2018, it was announced that a DLC level pack based on the series would be integrated for Lego DC Super-Villains. The level pack was released on May 14, 2019, where it served as an abridged version of the season two episode, "Summit".

The second half of Outsiders was promoted at RTX during the weekend of July 5, 2019, in Austin, Texas, at the Austin Convention Center.

References

External links
 
 Young Justice: Outsiders on Wikia's Young Justice Wiki

2019 American television seasons
2010s American LGBT-related animated television series
American animated action television series
American animated adventure television series
American animated superhero television series
DC Universe (streaming service) original programming
Refugees and displaced people in fiction
Teen superhero television series
Young Justice (TV series)
Studio Mir